Skerrow was a burgh in Dumfries and Galloway, Scotland.

Loch Skerrow Halt railway station, on the Portpatrick and Wigtownshire Joint Railway, served Skerrow from 1955 to 1963, when it closed due to the sparse population of the area.

References

External links
Photos of Loch Skerrow Halt and the surrounding countryside

Burghs
Geography of Dumfries and Galloway